Masters of the Universe is a media franchise based on a line of toys produced during the 1980s by Mattel.

Masters of the Universe may also refer to:

Mattel franchise
 Masters of the Universe (comics), the various comics series
 He-Man and the Masters of the Universe (2012 DC comic)
 He-Man and the Masters of the Universe, an animated TV series produced from 1983 to 1985
 He-Man and the Masters of the Universe (2002 TV series), a reboot of the 1983 animated series He-Man and the Masters of the Universe
 Masters of the Universe (film), a 1987 live action feature film starring Dolph Lundgren and Frank Langella
 Masters of the Universe: Revelation, a revival of the 1983 animated series He-Man and the Masters of the Universe
 He-Man and the Masters of the Universe (2021 TV series), a remake of the 1983 animated series He-Man and the Masters of the Universe

Video games
 Masters of the Universe: The Power of He-Man, a 1983 game designed by Intellivision
 Masters of the Universe: The Super Adventure, an interactive fiction game released in 1987 by U.S. Gold
 Masters of the Universe: The Arcade Game, an arcade-style computer game released in 1987 by U.S. Gold
 Masters of the Universe: The Movie, a 1987 video game (based on the Masters of the Universe film) from Gremlin Graphics

Music
 Masters of the Universe (Binary Star album), 2000
 Masters of the Universe (Hawkwind album), 1977
 Masters of the Universe (Pulp album), 1994
 "Masters of the Universe", a 2000 song by Juno Reactor

Books
 Masters of the Universe (book), a 2012 book on the topic of neoliberalism

See also
 The New Adventures of He-Man, an early-1990s animated television series based on Mattel's original He-Man and the Masters of the Universe characters.
 "Master of the Universe", high-flyers on Wall Street, a usage found in the Tom Wolfe novel The Bonfire of the Vanities and its film adaptation
 Master of The Universe (disambiguation)
 He-Man (disambiguation)